Melattur is a town in Malappuram district of Kerala. It is situated on the banks of the  Velliyar river. The name Melattur came from the Malayalam words 'Mele' (above), 'Aaru' (river) and 'Ooru' (place); i.e., 'place near upstream'. There are places named Edayattur (place near middle of the river), and Keezhattur (place near to the downstream) on the banks of the river Olippuzha. The town is well connected to Perinthalmanna, Manjeri, Mannarkkad, Pandikkad and Karuvarakundu by road. Melattur Railway Station is a minor railway station on the Nilambur - Shornur Line.

History

This place was originally part of the Valluvanad Swaroopam dynasty.

Valluvanad was an erstwhile princely state in the present state of Kerala, that extended from the Nila River (Bharathappuzha) in the South to the Panthaloor Mala in the North. On the west, it was bounded by the Arabian Sea at Ponnani and on the east by the Attapadi Hills.

Facilities
Government offices like subregistrar office, Educational office, KSEB office, village and Panchayath offices, Police Station, A Community Health Center, Ayurvedic Hospital, Unani Hospital, Krishibavan, PWD area office and several bank branches situated in melattur town itself. Melattur town is the center for several commercial shops and facilities and people from surrounding villages depend on Melattur for their day to day requirements.

Educational Facilities
A government aided high school is situated in Melattur town, with secondary Educational facility.
A Private self-financing Engineering college is also there near to Melattur town.

Suburbs and Villages
 Karuvarakkundu, Punnakkad and pavanapuram
 Iringattiri, Puthanazhi , Edapatta and manazhi
 Mythri Nagar, Eppikkad and Athani
 Uchoorakkadavu, Chemmaniyod and Manappady
 Vengur, Sahibpadi and Karyavattom
 Mannarmala, Pattikkad and Pooppalam

Transportation
Road

Melattur is situated on the Perumbilavu - Nilambur State Highway 39. Karuvarakundu - Melattur State Highway 70 ends at Melattur by joining Kumaramputhur - Olippuzha Road. Manjeri - Olippuzha - Kumaramputhur Road also passes through the town and one of the shortest route between Kozhikode and Palakkad is via Manjeri - Melattur - Mannarkkad.

From Melattur Panchayat bus stand, buses are available to Perinthalmanna, Pandikkad, Manjeri, Kozhikode, Mannarkkad, Palakkad, Coimbatore, Thuvvur, Edayattur, Karuvarakundu, Kalikavu, Nilambur, Edathanattukara, Moonadi, Kalpetta, Thamarassery, Pattambi, Vytilla Hub, Guruvayur, Thrissur and Kanjirappalli.

Rail

Melattur Railway Station is a minor Railway Station on the Nilambur - Shornur Line, trains are available from here to Nilambur, Shornur, Palakkad, Kottayam and Kochuveli.

Important Landmarks
 Melattur High school
 Ayamu Community Hall
 Palliative Care Center
 Vasudeva Library
 Puthanazhi Mosque
 Royal Unani Hospital
 Puthanazhi Medical Center
 Thathwamasy Manikanda Temple
 Kerala Gramin Bank Building
 Thottakkadakkavu Ayyappa Temple
 Loveline Convention Center
 Noorul Islam Highschool
 MEA Engineering College
 Jalaliya Juma Masjidh
 Pattikkad Juma Masjidh
 Jamia Nooriya Arabic College
 Irshad English School Melattur
 Melattur railway station
 Kaippully Vishnu-Vettekkaran Temple
 Njarakulagara Temple
Puthiyedath siva tEMPLE
Panayoor Mana
Edayattur Juma Masjid
Cholakkulam Juma Masjid 
Noorul Islam Madrasa, Cholakkulam
DNMAUP School Edayattur
Attuthrikovil Shiva Temple
Areekkara Pathayappura Heritage home

References 

http://www.melatturonline.com/
https://web.archive.org/web/20141208205533/http://www.alpettas.com/

Villages in Malappuram district
Perinthalmanna area